There are an estimated 8,000 people of Indian origin in Panama. They are employed in the shipping industry while others are mainly engaged in commerce. A majority are Hindu with a substantial Muslim and Sikh minority and they maintain Hindu temples, Gurdwaras and mosques in Panama City and Colón.

Panama's Indian community originates from Punjab, Gujarat and Sindh (now a part of Pakistan). The first significant immigration was during the US phase of the building of the Panama Canal and were primarily from the Caribbean (islands and British Guiana, now Guyana) under British rule. Many of the founders of the Colon Free Zone were Indians. Since then, the Indian community has grown with a slow but steady stream of immigrants.

Panamanians of Indian descent speak their native languages which could include Punjabi, Gujarati and Sindhi. Spanish is also used in the community between speakers of two languages that are not mutually intelligible.

Notable people 
 Mehr Eliezer - Winner of Señorita Panamá 2019 (she represented Panama at Miss Universe 2019). She was born in New Delhi, India and raised in Ciudad de Panamá.

See also
Hinduism in Panama

References 

 Panama#Demographics

External links
 Indian Associations in Panama
 India-Panama Relations
 India Festival in Panama

Asian Panamanian
Panama
Ethnic groups in Panama
Indian Latin American